The Electoral district of Ringwood was a single-member electoral district of the Tasmanian House of Assembly. It was based in an agricultural region to the southwest of Launceston, Tasmania's second city.

The seat was created ahead of the Assembly's first election held in 1856, and was largely recreated as Cressy at the 1886 election, with a less populated region moving to Cumberland. The seat had a higher turnover of members in its first eighteen years than any other seat in Tasmania.

Members for Ringwood

References
 
 
 Parliament of Tasmania (2006). The Parliament of Tasmania from 1956

Ringwood